Marty Stuart is an American country music singer. His discography comprises 18 studio albums, one soundtrack album, two live albums, and various compilation albums, in addition to 33 singles.  Stuart has recorded for a variety of record labels, but his most commercially successful period was as a member of MCA Records' roster during the late 1980s and 1990s.  Since then, Stuart has mainly released albums through his self-owned label Superlatone Records, often in conjunction with other labels to handle distribution.

Studio albums

1970s and 1980s

1990s

2000s, 2010s and 2020s

Live albums

Soundtracks

Album/Book Combos

Compilation albums

Singles

1980s

1990s

2000s and 2010s

Other singles

Other charted songs

Guest singles

Music videos

Guest appearances

Notes
A ^ With A Little Help From My Friends was reissued in 1992 as The Slim Richey Sessions
B ^ Way Out West reached number 71 on Billboard's United States Top Current Albums chart, which ranks the best-selling recently-released albums. It never appeared on the magazine's normal album chart, which includes older releases in addition to current albums.
C ^ Songs I Sing In The Dark is an acoustic album that is to be released in a song by song fashion, with one new track debuting each month, starting in March 2021.  A release date for the entire project has not been announced.

References

Country music discographies
Discographies of American artists